The Vanishings at Caddo Lake is an upcoming American thriller film written and directed by Celine Held and Logan George. It stars Dylan O'Brien and Eliza Scanlen. M. Night Shyamalan serves as a producer through his Blinding Edge Pictures banner.

Premise 
After an eight year-old girl mysteriously vanishes, connections begin to form between past deaths and disappearances at Caddo Lake.

Cast 
 Dylan O'Brien
 Eliza Scanlen
 Lauren Ambrose
 Eric Lange
 Sam Hennings
 Diana Hopper

Production 
The Vanishings at Caddo Lake is a thriller film written and directed by filmmaking duo Celine Held and Logan George. In August 2021, Dylan O'Brien and Eliza Scanlen were in talks to star in the film, and a casting call was released, revealing M. Night Shyamalan would produce under his production label Blinding Edge Pictures. By October 2021, O'Brien and Scanlen were set to star, and Lauren Ambrose, Eric Lange, Sam Hennings, and Diana Hopper had joined the cast, with filming beginning on October 4 in Shreveport, Louisiana. Held and George sought 1998–2004 period-specific vehicles from locals in order to produce an authentic feel to the story's community. Filming wrapped on November 18, 2021.

References

External links 
 

Upcoming films
American mystery thriller films
Blinding Edge Pictures films
Films shot in Louisiana
Films produced by M. Night Shyamalan
Upcoming English-language films